is a subway station on the Toei Ōedo Line in Chūō, Tokyo, Japan, operated by the Tokyo subway operator Tokyo Metropolitan Bureau of Transportation (Toei).

Lines
Kachidoki Station is served by the Toei Ōedo Line, and is numbered "E-17".

Station layout
The station has two side platforms on the second basement ("B2F") level, serving two tracks.

Platforms

History
The station opened on 12 December 2000.

Passenger statistics
In fiscal 2011, the station was used by an average of 76,086 passengers daily.

See also

 List of railway stations in Japan

References

External links

 Toei station information 

Railway stations in Japan opened in 2000
Toei Ōedo Line
Stations of Tokyo Metropolitan Bureau of Transportation
Railway stations in Tokyo